Reverend Mother Saint Mathilde Raclot (born Marie-Justine Raclot; 9 February 1814 – 20 January 1911) was a 19th-century French Catholic nun and missionary from the Sisters of the Infant Jesus who traveled to different countries in East Asia to set up Catholic schools and orphanages. In Singapore, she founded the Convent of the Holy Infant Jesus girls' school and later traveled to Japan where she established a hospice and homeless shelter. In 2014, Mother Mathilde Raclot was inducted into the Singapore Women's Hall of Fame.

Early life 
Marie-Justine Raclot was born in 1814 to French soldier Francis Raclot and his wife Charlotte Lamirelle of a middle-class family in the small village of Suriauville in Lorraine, France. As the granddaughter of the village mayor she was sent to a boarding school in Langres run by the Sisters of the Infant Jesus where she returned at the age of 18 to join the Congregation of the Sisters of the Holy Infant Jesus. After two years she was given the religious name Mathilde and sent to teach in Bagnols-sur-Cèze, followed by Béziers and Sète.

Missionary work
On 18 September 1852, Mother Mathilde embarked with three other Sisters on a voyage to Malaya to guide and support the group of Sisters whose previous mission had failed a year earlier. The sisters landed in Penang in October 1852 and began work at an orphanage and school before traveling to Singapore in February 1854 under request of Father Jean-Marie Beurel. Mother Mathilde remained in Singapore and eventually establishing Christian girls' school the Convent of the Holy Infant Jesus and opening an orphanage to care for abandoned children.

In 1872, Mother Mathilde and her Sisters traveled to Japan where they founded the Saint Maur School at Yokohama, Kanagawa Prefecture to teach and care for Japanese children. She received permission in 1876 to stay there indefinitely.

Death
On 20 January 1911, Mother Mathilde Raclot died at the age of 96 and was buried at the Yokohama Foreign General Cemetery.

Legacy
In 2014, owing to her contributions to Singapore, Mother Mathilde Raclot was inducted into the Singapore Women's Hall of Fame.

References

External links
Sisters of the Infant Jesus
Article "Mère Sainte Mathilde Raclot" (Infant Jesus Sisters' Archives Website)

1814 births
1911 deaths
20th-century French nuns
French Roman Catholic missionaries
People from Lorraine
19th-century French nuns